The Hoher Tenn, formerly also called the Hochtenn, is a double-peaked mountain in the Austrian federal state of Salzburg. The Tenn belongs to the Glockner Group in the central part of the High Tauern in the Austrian Central Alps. Long knife-edge ridges run away to the northeast and northwest. It has a large topographical prominence, especially to the north, which, together with its easy accessibility, make it a popular climbing mountain. Seen from Zell am See in the Pinzgau it is second only to the Imbachhorn in dominating the Tauern panorama.

History 
The Hoher Tenn was first ascended, according to unconfirmed sources, in the 1840s by Cardinal Frederick, Prince of Schwarzenberg "with a small company" (in kleiner Gesellschaft). The first documented crossing of both summits was on 16 August 1871 by the furrier, Albert Kaindl, from Linz and Josef Pöschl from Vienna with mountain guide, Johann Grill, known as the Kederbacher. That said, the party found trigonometric signs on both peaks that must have been made in the 1850s as part of the state survey.

Literature and map 
 Willi End: Alpine Club Guide Glocknergruppe, Bergverlag Rother, Munich, 2003, 
 Eduard Richter: Die Erschließung der Ostalpen, III. Band, Verlag des Deutschen und Oesterreichischen Alpenvereins, Berlin, 1894
 Alpine Club Map 1:25,000, Sheet 40, Glocknergruppe

References

External links 

Mountains of the Alps
Glockner Group
Mountains of Salzburg (state)
Alpine three-thousanders
Fusch an der Großglocknerstraße